David Marrison Hallatt (born 15 July 1937) is a former Anglican Bishop of Shrewsbury in the diocese of Lichfield.

Hallatt was educated at Birkenhead School and the University of Southampton. Ordained in 1963 he began his career as curate at St Andrew’s Maghull. After that he was successively the Vicar of Totley, Team Rector of Didsbury and finally (before his elevation to the episcopate) Archdeacon of Halifax.

Retirement
A keen ornithologist, in retirement he continued to serve the Church as an honorary assistant bishop within Sheffield diocese (2001–2010) and then Salisbury diocese (since 2011).

References

 

 

1937 births
People educated at Birkenhead School
Alumni of the University of Southampton
Archdeacons of Halifax
20th-century Church of England bishops
Living people
Anglican bishops of Shrewsbury
Fellows of the Royal Geographical Society